Siddhayatan, is a Jain-Hindu Tirth (pilgrimage site) in North America founded in 2008 by Acharya Shree Yogeesh. It is located on a  site at Windom near Dallas, Texas, United States. Siddhayatan currently has miniatured versions of pilgrimage sites from India, including Kailash-Mansarovar, Lake Rakshastal, Ashtapad, Sammedshikhar, Bahubali, and thus is considered as a pilgrimage rather than a temple or place of worship or prayer. According to India Abroad, it is a “Spiritual Disneyland”. The tour of the entire pilgrimage is estimated to be 4 hours.

History and functioning 
Acharya Shree Yogeesh founded the tirtha in 2008. In 2015, an eastern European chapter was established at Estonia, Siddhayatan Mandir Estonia, which is also known as a Tirthankara Mandir.  Siddhayatan Spiritual Retreat Center & Ashram in Texas is legally registered as Siddhayatan Tirth and is a 501(c)3 non-profit organization. Sadhvi Siddhali Shree and Sadhvi Anubhuti, the disciples of Acharya Shree Yogeesh are serving as the spiritual director and the operations director of the Tirtha. Siddhayatan provides the options for stress relief, reduce addictions, PTSD help, ashram living experience, and volunteer programs apart from the traditional spiritual, self-improvement educational programs and guidance. Siddhayatan  is known for publishing an e-magazine Siddhaaloka.

The Tirtha 
Siddhayatan Tirth has an 11,000 sq ft Tirthankara Mandir, which includes both Shwetambar and Digambar murtis of the 24 Jain Tirthankaras, with 6 main statues, the largest being Parshvanath, which is also the largest Jain statue in the United States. In the smaller temples, it has Godess Saraswati, Godess Lakshmi, and Lord Ganesha. In the pilgrimage site, it features a 73” statue of Adinath, 73” sitting meditation statue of Shiva, 7 ft 5” statue of Gommteshwar Bahubali.

See also
 Buddhism in the United States
 Hinduism in the United States
 Jainism in the United States
 Meditation
 Yoga

Bibliography 
 Yogeesh, Acharya Shree. Soul Talks: New Beginnings. United States, Siddhayatan Tirth, 2015. ISBN 9780984385454
 Yogeesh, Acharya Shree. Soulful Wisdom & Art: 101 Thought-Provoking Quotes for Inspiration and Transformation. N.p., Siddhayatan Tirth, 2016. ISBN 9780984385485
 Yogeesh, Acharya Shree. Awaken! A Handbook for the Truth Seeker. United States, Siddha Sangh Publications, 2011. ISBN 9780984385423
 Yogeesh, Acharya Shree. Soul Talks: Path of Purification. N.p., Siddhayatan Tirth, 2019. ISBN 9781733475006
 Shree, Sadhvi Siddhali. Shine Through Wisdom. United States, Siddha Sangh Publications, 2015.ISBN 9780984385461
 Shree, Sadhvi Siddhali. 31 Day Challenge to a Changed You. N.p., Siddhayatan Tirth, 2009. ISBN 9780984385409

References

External links
 Siddhayatan Hindu-Jain Tirth
 Acharya Shree Yogeesh, Founder of Siddhayatan

Indian-American culture in Texas
Jain temples in the United States
Temples in Texas
Spiritual retreats
2008 establishments in Texas
Jainism in the United States
Religious buildings and structures completed in 2008